Longport can refer to:
Longport, New Jersey in the United States
Longport, Staffordshire in Stoke-on-Trent, England
Longphort, a term used in Ireland for a Viking ship enclosure

References